Amaury Capiot (born 25 June 1993) is a Belgian professional racing cyclist, who currently rides for UCI ProTeam . He is the son of former Belgian racing cyclist Johan Capiot.

Major results

2011
 1st Gent–Menen
 1st Remouchamps–Ferrières–Remouchamps
 1st Stage 1 Keizer der Juniores
 8th Paris–Roubaix Juniors
2014
 4th Antwerpse Havenpijl
 6th Grand Prix Criquielion
 7th Paris–Roubaix Espoirs
 9th Overall Tour du Loir-et-Cher
1st  Young rider classification
 9th Overall Paris–Arras Tour
 10th Kernen Omloop Echt-Susteren
2015
 4th Velothon Berlin
 6th Arnhem–Veenendaal Classic
 7th Ronde van Limburg
 7th De Kustpijl
 9th Münsterland Giro
 9th Omloop van het Houtland
2016
 1st  Combativity classification Tour of Belgium
 3rd Omloop Mandel-Leie-Schelde
 4th Grand Prix de la ville de Pérenchies
 4th Grote Prijs Marcel Kint
 4th Tour de l'Eurométropole
 5th Binche–Chimay–Binche
 6th Ronde van Drenthe
 6th Nationale Sluitingsprijs
 7th Dorpenomloop Rucphen
 7th Grand Prix de Fourmies
 7th Kampioenschap van Vlaanderen
2017
 5th Clásica de Almería
2018
 2nd Nokere Koerse
 6th Three Days of Bruges–De Panne
2019
 3rd Paris–Bourges
 5th Paris–Tours
 6th Grote Prijs Jef Scherens
 8th Brussels Cycling Classic
 8th Grand Prix Pino Cerami
 8th Grand Prix de Fourmies
 9th Ronde van Limburg
2020
 3rd Overall Tour de Wallonie
 4th Trofeo Playa de Palma
 6th Scheldeprijs
 6th Clásica de Almería
 7th Druivenkoers Overijse
 7th Antwerp Port Epic
 9th Brussels Cycling Classic
2021
 3rd Clàssica Comunitat Valenciana 1969
 6th Le Samyn
 7th Paris–Camembert
 9th Overall Tour de Wallonie
 9th Gran Piemonte
 9th Vuelta a Castilla y León
 10th Paris–Tours
2022
 1st Grand Prix La Marseillaise
 1st Stage 3 Boucles de la Mayenne
 2nd Clàssica Comunitat Valenciana 1969
 3rd Grand Prix de Fourmies
 4th Grand Prix du Morbihan
 6th Grand Prix d'Isbergues
 7th Kuurne–Brussels–Kuurne
 7th Grand Prix de Denain
 9th Paris–Tours
 10th Tour du Finistère
 10th Kampioenschap van Vlaanderen

Grand Tour general classification results timeline

References

External links
 

1993 births
Living people
Belgian male cyclists
People from Lanaken
Cyclists from Limburg (Belgium)
21st-century Belgian people